Zawiat at-Taban, or Taban; also An-Nayan or Wadi Sammalus, is a check point in the District of Jabal al Akhdar in north-eastern Libya. It is located on the cross-roads between the Charruba–Mechili–Timimi desert road and the Marawa–Wadi Sammalus.

Between February 1925 and  August 1927, Wadi Sammalus was the site of several colonial battles between Italian forces and Senussi Rebels.

References

External links
Satellite map at Maplandia.com

Populated places in Jabal al Akhdar